The Diamond Stars Football Club is a Sierra Leonean professional football club based in Koidu Town, Kono District, Sierra Leone. The club represent the diamond-rich Kono District and is a member of the Sierra Leone National Premier League, the top football league in Sierra Leone. The club is coached by a Class A Coach ZAPA.

History
The club got the name the Diamond Stars due to the rich diamond reserves in Kono district, where it is based. Diamond stars have one of the largest fan bases among  Sierra Leonean football clubs and its supporters are primarily from Kono District. The  club is owned a\ by the KonoDistrict Stakeholders, but was previously sponsored by the Koidu Holdings, diamond mining company, through their corporate social responsibility. However, the company stopped funding the Club in 2014.

The Diamond Stars are the current champions of the 2012 and 2013 Premier League season, and the first club outside Freetown to ever won the Premier League.

The club current coach is a Class A Coah ZAPA.

The club have won the Sierra Leonean FA Cup once, in 1992 and they are one of the most popular football clubs in Sierra Leone.

In October, 2018, the Board of Trustees of the Diamond Stars Football Club appointed a new executive, chaired by PC George Bockrie Torto as Team Chairman and Mr. Adams Tommy as Team Manager. Other executive members include: Mark Yambasu (Deputy Chairman, Sahr Amadu Komba (Deputy Team Manager); Sahr Ezra Kellie (Team Secretary); Munya Kanneh (Welfare Officer); Tamba Senessie (PRO1); Berns Komba Lebbie (PRO2); Tamba Sylvanus Morsay (Organizing Secretary)

Achievements
Sierra Leone League: 2
 2012 and 2013.

Sierra Leonean FA Cup: 2
 1992 and 2012.

Performance in CAF competitions
CAF Cup: 1 appearance
1994 – withdrew in Quarter-Finals

CAF Cup Winners' Cup: 2 appearances
1989 – First Round
1993 – Preliminary Round

References

External links
Team profile – leballonrond.fr

Football clubs in Sierra Leone
1954 establishments in Sierra Leone
Koidu